Svalbreen is a glacier in Nathorst Land at Spitsbergen, Svalbard. It has a length of about thirteen kilometers, and extends from the mountain of Blæja to the valley of Danzigdalen. The mountain of Svalhøgda is located between Svalbreen and Harebreen, and these glaciers merge further north.

References 

Glaciers of Spitsbergen